Count Patrick Keyes O'Clery, The O'Clery (1849 – 23 May 1913), was a barrister and was Home Rule M.P. for County Wexford.

Patrick Keyes O'Clery was the son of John Walsh O'Clery, The O'Clery.  He was born in County Limerick and educated at Trinity College Dublin.  He was called to the bar by the Middle Temple in 1874.

Keyes O'Clery served as an M.P. from 1874 to 1880.  At the general election of 1880, although he was backed by the Catholic clergy, he was defeated by the Parnellite candidate Garrett Byrne.  During the campaign, there was a serious outbreak of violence at a meeting at Enniscorthy on Easter Sunday, 28 March 1880, in which Parnell himself was physically attacked.  In the election the following month, Byrne was elected by a majority of over 2,000.

The O'Clery received the Papal Orders of St. Gregory (Military Cross) and of Pius IX.  In 1903, he was created a Count by Pope Leo XIII.  He was also a Private Chamberlain at the Vatican Court and a Knight Grand Cross of the Spanish Order of Isabella the Catholic.  By coincidence, Sir George Bowyer, Bt., with whom he shared the representation for Co. Wexford, also had a number of Papal decorations.

Keyes O'Clery wrote two books about Italy.

He died at Twyford Abbey near Ealing.

His widow, Katherine Countess O'Clery, died aged 77 on 4 August 1919 at St. John's Villa, St. Leonards-on-Sea.

References

External links 
 

1849 births
1913 deaths
Members of the Parliament of the United Kingdom for County Wexford constituencies (1801–1922)
UK MPs 1874–1880
Alumni of Trinity College Dublin
Members of the Middle Temple
Papal counts